Local elections in Taguig were held on May 9, 2016, within the Philippine general election. The voters elected for the elective local posts in the city: the mayor, vice mayor, two District representatives, and councilors, eight in each of the city's two legislative districts.

Candidates

Representative, 1st District (Taguig-Pateros)

Incumbent Congressman Arnel Cerafica will run for his third and final term.

Representative, 2nd District

Incumbent Congressman Lino Cayetano has filed his Certificate of Candidacy for his second term but later withdrew from the race and decided to return to show business. He was replaced by his sister Senator Pia Cayetano, who will be facing against Councilor Michelle Anne Gonzales.

Mayor
Incumbent city mayor Lani Cayetano will seek her third and final term, while currently facing charges before the Sandiganbayan over the lock-down of the Taguig City Hall Session Hall in August 2010. Rommel Carlos Tiñga, Jr., cousin of former city mayor Sigfrido Tiñga, was supposed to be her opponent but later bowed out of the race, leaving her unopposed.

Vice Mayor

Councilors, 1st District

Councilors, 2nd District

References

2016 Philippine local elections
Elections in Taguig
2016 elections in Metro Manila